Ophiocoma is a genus of brittle stars belonging to the family Ophiocomidae.

Selected species
 Ophiocoma aethiops (Lütken, 1859)
 Ophiocoma echinata (Lamarck, 1816)
 Ophiocoma erinaceus (Müller & Troschel, 1842)
 Ophiocoma scolopendrina (Lamarck, 1816)
 Ophiocoma wendtii (Müller & Troschel, 1842)

References

 Biolib

Ophiocomidae
Ophiuroidea genera
Taxa named by Louis Agassiz